Wallace Bonilha Felix (born 26 January 1996) is a Brazilian footballer who last played for Figueirense.

Club career

FC Nitra
Bonilha made his Fortuna Liga debut for Nitra at Tehelné pole against reigning champions Slovan Bratislava on 1 November 2020. Bonilha came in as a last-minute replacement for Michal Faško, with the final score already set for Nitra through Alen Mustafić's second-half strike. Bonilha only appeared for one other fixture for Nitra, playing at pod Zoborom against DAC 1904 Dunajská Streda

References

External links
 Futbalnet profile 
 
 

1996 births
Living people
Footballers from Rio de Janeiro (city)
Brazilian footballers
Brazilian expatriate footballers
Association football defenders
Fluminense FC players
FC Lahti players
Tupi Football Club players
Oeste Futebol Clube players
FC Nitra players
Figueirense FC players
Veikkausliiga players
Campeonato Brasileiro Série C players
Campeonato Brasileiro Série B players
Slovak Super Liga players
Expatriate footballers in Finland
Brazilian expatriate sportspeople in Finland
Expatriate footballers in Slovakia
Brazilian expatriate sportspeople in Slovakia